The 2009–10 Serbian League Belgrade was the sixth season of the league under its current title. It began in August 2009 and ended in June 2010.

League table

External links
 Football Association of Serbia
 Football Association of Belgrade

Serbian League Belgrade seasons
3
Serb